Ramocsaháza is a village in Szabolcs-Szatmár-Bereg county, in the Northern Great Plain region of eastern Hungary.

Jews lived in Ramocsaháza for many years until they were murdered in the Holocaust

Geography

References

Populated places in Szabolcs-Szatmár-Bereg County
Jewish communities destroyed in the Holocaust